Keith Buckley (born November 19, 1979) is an American singer, best known as the vocalist and lyricist of the now defunct hardcore punk band Every Time I Die and the heavy metal supergroup The Damned Things. He is also a published author.

Early life and education
Buckley was born in Buffalo, New York. He attended Virginia Tech and then the University at Buffalo before doing music full-time. He is also a former English teacher.

Career

Every Time I Die
In 1998, Buckley established the band Every Time I Die with his brother, Jordan, in Buffalo, New York. He describes Every Time I Die as a "Buffalo Bills tailgate party and a high school kegger". During tours, they enjoy setting their hair on fire and drinking. One of Buckley's writing tactics is to get incoherently drunk and see what comes out.

On January 4, 2006, Buckley and Every Time I Die were in a van accident but escaped unharmed.

On December 4, 2021, Buckley announced that he was taking a hiatus from the band for his mental health.

Side projects
Buckley is a member of Finale, his side project. The two-piece plays indie and acoustic music. Buckley lent his vocal talents to an R&B hook in Chae Hawk's track "PBS" and also "Stockholm Sindrome", a track with Philly/Pittsburgh electro-clash artist Pfunkt. He is also featured with Corey Letson on Four Year Strong's 90s cover album Explains It All covering the song "Bullet with Butterfly Wings" by The Smashing Pumpkins.

He is also a member of supergroup The Damned Things, founded in 2009, alongside members of Fall Out Boy and Anthrax. The band released its debut album Ironiclast in 2010, but was on hiatus from 2012 until 2018. They released their second album High Crimes on April 26, 2019 and have toured subsequently. 

Buckley released his first novel, Scale, in December 2015 through Rare Bird Books and Lit. He released his second novel, Watch, in August 2018 through Rare Bird Books and Lit.

Buckley is a member of an indie electro duo named Tape, alongside Joshua Hurley. He was also the vocalist for Buffalo’s local 90s cover band Soul Patch.

Buckley contributed to the vocal cover and tribute of "The Broken Vow" by Converge released June 27, 2022 as part of Two Minutes to Late Night's series 'Hardcore Forever'. Additionally Buckley has contributed on released tracks by SeeYouSpaceCowboy, Knocked Loose, Pretty Boy Stomp, Stray From the Path, and Say Anything.

Personal life
He has a younger brother, Jordan Buckley, who was the lead guitarist in the same band. They had a younger sister named Jaclyn, who lived with Rett syndrome and died from it in early 2017. Since then, Keith has encouraged disabled attendees of the band's shows to tag him personally.

Buckley also has a tattoo of Spock's head on a lawn chair, day dreaming about what he (Spock) would look like with a moustache. Spock has a tear coming out of his eye because he cannot grow a moustache.

References

External links
 Official website of Every Time I Die

1979 births
Living people
American male singer-songwriters
American heavy metal singers
American singer-songwriters
American rock songwriters
University at Buffalo alumni
Every Time I Die members
21st-century American male singers
21st-century American singers
The Damned Things members